Camila Márdila (born 21 February 1988) is a Brazilian actress.  Her credits include The Second Mother, Justiça and Amor de Mãe.

Filmography

Film

Television

References

External links 
 

Brazilian film actresses
1988 births
Living people
21st-century Brazilian actresses